Metacrambus carectellus is a species of moth in the family Crambidae. It is found in Portugal, Spain, France, Italy, the Balkan Peninsula, Ukraine, Russia, Transcaucasia, Asia Minor, the Palestinian Territories, Lebanon, Syria, Iran and Uzbekistan.

The wingspan is 18–23 mm. Adults are on wing in July and August in one generation per year.

The larvae feed on various grasses.

References

Moths described in 1847
Crambinae
Moths of Europe
Moths of Asia